Acraea oncaea, the window acraea, is a butterfly of the family Nymphalidae. It is found in KwaZulu-Natal, Transvaal, Zimbabwe, Mozambique, from eastern Africa to Abyssinia and in Congo.

Description

A. oncaea Hpff. (55 e) is distinguished at once by the fine black submarginal longitudinal streaks in cellules 3 to 5 (to 6) of the fore wing; the discal dot in 6 is usually wanting on the fore wing. male –  the forewing is thinly scaled, with dull orange-yellow ground-colour, at the base not darkened, and at the apex only black for a breadth of 2 mm.; discal dots usually small and punctiform, arranged exactly as in caecilia. Hindwing more densely scaled than the fore wing and above more reddish; its marginal band very narrow but more distinctly spotted. In the female the wings have the ground-colour above dark grey and the fore wing has a broad white subapical band from the costal margin to vein 3. South and East Africa to the southern Congo region and Abyssinia.-female ab. obscura Suff. Forewing above brown, hindwing above whitish with rose-red spots at the base, at the inner margin and behind the discal dots. -female ab. defasciata Suff. Forewing brown without white subapical band. - female ab. alboradiata Suff. has the veins of the hindwing white. -female ab. modesta Suff. Hindwing with a large white area in the middle. - caoncius Suff. is a seasonal form (?), in which the apex of the forewing above has only a fine black marginal line quite as on the under surface. German East Africa, ab. liacea 
Suff. only differs in having the marginal band of the hindwing not sharply defined above and composed of thick black lunules beneath. German East Africa.

Biology
Adults are on the wing year round, with a peak from September to May. There are multiple generations per year.

The larvae feed on Xylotheca kraussiana, Tricliceras longepedunculatum and Passifloraceae species, including Adenia species.

Taxonomy
It is a member of the Acraea caecilia species group. See also Pierre & Bernaud, 2014.

References

External links

Die Gross-Schmetterlinge der Erde 13: Die Afrikanischen Tagfalter. Plate XIII 55 e
Images representing Acraea oncaea at Bold.

oncaea
Butterflies described in 1855
Taxa named by Carl Heinrich Hopffer